Elfin Sports Cars Pty Ltd (formerly known as Elfin Sports Cars) is an Australian car manufacturer company that was founded by Garrie Cooper. It has been an Australian manufacturer of sports cars and motor racing cars since 1959.

Elfin Sports Cars is currently owned by the estate of former British racing driver Tom Walkinshaw, through his company Walkinshaw Performance which also owns Holden Special Vehicles. It was previously owned by businessmen and historic racing enthusiasts Bill Hemming and Nick Kovatch (who remains as technical director) who purchased it in 1998.

Elfin is the oldest continuous sports car maker in Australia and one of the most successful with 29 championships and major Grand Prix titles. The original factory was located at Conmurra Avenue, Edwardstown in suburban Adelaide, South Australia. The company is currently located at Braeside, a suburb of Melbourne, Australia.

History
The company was founded in South Australia as Elfin Sports Cars in October 1959 by Garrie Cooper, who would go on to be a champion race driver as well as a successful designer and builder of Elfin racing and sports-racing cars. In 1983, following the death of its founder the previous year, the firm was bought by Tasmanian Don Elliott, racing driver Tony Edmondson and mechanic John Porter who re-established the provision of parts and service to existing owners.

Cooper died suddenly on ANZAC Day  (April 25) in 1982, at the age of 46, from a burst aorta, due to the vessel's weakness from medication he took to thin his blood after a mid-1970s heart valve operation. Cliff Cooper, Garrie's father, completed outstanding orders, including six new generation Formula Vees, before offering the business for sale as well as designing a new Formula Vee, the Crusader, and a Formula Brabham car.

In 1993, Victorian Murray Richards acquired Elfin and set out to build a new generation Elfin Clubman called the Type 3. In failing health, he sold Elfin to Bill Hemming and Nick Kovatch in 1998 who relocated the business to Melbourne, Victoria.

Elfin subsequently began a collaboration with GM Holden, revealing a concept MS8 Streamliner at the Melbourne International Motor Show in 2004. Limited production of two versions of the MS8 began in March 2006 and after the business was sold to Tom Walkinshaw (of HSV / Walkinshaw Performance) in December 2006, future limited production units were retailed Australia-wide via select HSV dealerships in each state.

Following his death in December 2010, ownership of Elfin remained vested in the estate of Tom Walkinshaw ... but, there has been no further production of any Elfin cars since March 2012.

The Elfin Heritage Centre dedicated to Elfin Sports Cars in Melbourne. The centre features around 12 current and historic vehicles on display.

Racing
Elfin drivers have won 29 championships and major titles including two Australian Drivers' Championships (1973, 1975), four Australian Sports Car Championships (1970, 1973, 1974, 1975), three Australian Tourist Trophies (1966, 1976, 1978), and four Australian Formula Ford Series (1970, 1971, 1974, 1982). In addition Elfin cars also won the Singapore Grand Prix (1968), the Malaysian Grand Prix (1968, 1969, 1972), and the New Zealand Grand Prix (1973, 1974).

Drivers of Elfin cars included  Formula One World Champion James Hunt, and French F1 driver, Didier Pironi. Others included Australian F1 drivers Vern Schuppan and Larry Perkins, as well as John Bowe, Frank Matich, John McCormack, Bob Jane, Allan Grice, Peter Manton and Mark Mclaughlin.

Models

Recent vehicles
In 2006, Elfin began producing two related V8-powered sports cars : the MS8 Streamliner and the MS8 Clubman. Thereafter, in 2008, Elfin introduced what might be termed an entry-level model, the turbocharged four cylinder T5 Clubman.

Engines for the MS8 cars were essentially standard production 5.7 litre Gen III V8s as supplied to GM Holden for their VZ-series Commodore vehicles. For the T5 Clubman, Pontiac-derived engines were supplied by GM Powertrain (USA).

The MS8 cars have significant power (circa 255kW) for their size and weight, but are infamous for "spirited" handling. Some media regarded the MS8 vehicles as somewhat disappointing, considering Elfin's motorport history.

Elfin vehicle production was officially in hiatus by March 2012, with ongoing enquiries at that time to be directed to the related Walkinshaw Performance business.

Historic vehicles – Garrie Cooper era
The original company produced 248 racing and sports racing cars in 27 different models over a 25-year period.

Historic vehicles – The post–Garrie-Cooper era

See also

 List of automobile manufacturers
 List of car brands

References

External links

Elfin Cars Pty Ltd
Elfin Heritage Centre
Elfin: The Spirit of Speed
Introducing the Holden Elfin MS8 Clubman and MS8 Streamliner
Brian Ax with a profile of Elfin
Video of Elfin Clubman and Streamliner MS8s
Elfin racing images Retrieved from Autopics on 14 August 2008
Elfin MS8 overview

 
Australian brands
Australian racecar constructors
Lotus Seven replicas
Sports car manufacturers
Vehicle manufacturing companies established in 1957
Australian companies established in 1957
Car manufacturers of Australia